Poienile Izei ( or ,  or Polien-Glod) is a commune in Maramureș County, Maramureș, Romania. The commune is composed of a single village, Poienile Izei, which was part of Botiza Commune until being split off in 1995.

At the 2002 census, 99.9% of inhabitants were Romanians and 0.1% Ukrainians. 100% were Romanian Orthodox.

The commune's Saint Parascheva Church was built in 1700 and is one of eight Wooden churches of Maramureș that are listed by UNESCO as a World Heritage Site.

References

Communes in Maramureș County
Localities in Romanian Maramureș